The Seattle Japanese Garden is a 3.5 acre (14,000 m²) Japanese garden in the Madison Park neighborhood of Seattle. The garden is located in the southern end of the Washington Park Arboretum on Lake Washington Boulevard East. The garden is one of the oldest Japanese gardens in North America, and is regarded as one of the most authentic Japanese gardens in the United States.

History 
Beginning in 1937, plans were made to include a Japanese garden in the Arboretum, and after 20 years of fundraising, the project began. Experts Kiyoshi Inoshita and Juki Iida were appointed as designers and completed their plans in 1959. Juki Iida selected William Yorozu as the prime contractor for plants, Richard Yamasaki for stone setting, and Kei Ishimitsu for garden structures. Careful construction began and was completed the next year, 1960.

Construction and design of the garden included bringing over 500 granite boulders from the Cascade mountains, ranging in size from 1,000 pounds to 11 tons. Wrapped in bamboo matting, the boulders traveled to Madison Valley and were arranged to complement a variety of culturally appropriate azaleas, rhododendrons, camellias, mosses, and ferns.
The garden featured a 'Shoseian' teahouse donated by the city of Tokyo in 1959. 

During their October, 1960 stop in Seattle, the Japanese Crown Prince Akihito and Crown Princess Michiko visited the newly opened garden. Together, they planted a cherry tree and a white birch, the latter a symbol of the Princess's family. 

The original tea house was burned by vandals on April 9, 1973, and reconstructed by Yasunori "Fred" Sugita in 1980 and 1981. It took eight years of fundraising by the Arboretum Foundation until the teahouse was ready to be rebuilt.

The garden has undertaken several other infrastructure improvements, including a new gatehouse and community meeting room. The Gatehouse project was completed in 2009. The new structure includes a bronze gate designed by a local Seattle sculptor Gerard Tsutakawa.

The garden was awarded the Japanese Foreign Minister’s Commendation for its contributions to the promotion of mutual understanding between Japan and the United States on December 1, 2020.

Cultural events 

The Seattle Japanese Garden hosts several cultural celebrations throughout the year, including:
Kodomo no Hi (Children's Day)
Tanabata
  Wondering and Wandering
Otsukimi (Moon Viewing)
Keiro no Hi (Respect for Elders Day)
Momijigari (Maple Viewing)

These special cultural events feature local performers, including calligraphers, taiko ensembles, dance troupes, and traditional musicians.

Community partners 
The Seattle Japanese Garden is a partnership between the City of Seattle, the Associated Recreation Council (The Seattle Japanese Garden Advisory Council) and the Washington Park Arboretum.

See also
 History of the Japanese in Seattle
 Seattle Chinese Garden

References

Further reading

External links

Japanese Garden at Seattle Parks and Recreation
Seattle Japanese Garden at JGarden.org
Japanese Garden Society of Seattle at JapaneseGardensociety.org

Parks in Seattle
Japanese gardens in Seattle
Tourist attractions in Seattle